Tell Your Children is a 1922 British drama film directed by Donald Crisp. Alfred Hitchcock is credited as a title designer. It was the first film in which later Carry On actor Charles Hawtrey was to appear – he was aged eight at the time. The film is now lost.

Cast
 Doris Eaton as Rosny Edwards
 Walter Tennyson as John Haslar
 Margaret Halstan as Lady Sybil Edwards
 Warwick Ward as Lord Belhurst
 Adeline Hayden Coffin as Nanny Dyson
 Gertrude McCoy as Maudie
 Mary Rorke as Susan Hasler
 A. Harding Steerman as Vicar
 Cecil Morton York as Reuben Haslar
 Charles Hawtrey

See also
 Alfred Hitchcock filmography

References

External links

1922 films
1922 drama films
1922 lost films
British silent feature films
British drama films
British black-and-white films
Films directed by Donald Crisp
Lost British films
Lost drama films
1920s British films
Silent drama films